Mike B. Anderson, sometimes credited as Mikel B. Anderson, is an American television director who works on The Simpsons and has directed numerous episodes of the show, and was animated in "The Secret War of Lisa Simpson" as cadet Anderson. While a college student, he directed the live action feature films Alone in the T-Shirt Zone and Kamillions. Since 1990, he has worked primarily in animation including being a consulting producer on the series, The Oblongs, and story consultant on Tripping the Rift.

He has won two Emmy Awards for directing Simpsons episodes, "Homer's Phobia" in 1997 and "HOMR" in 2001. For "Homer's Phobia" he won the Annie Award for Best Individual Achievement: Directing in a TV Production, and the WAC Winner Best Director for Primetime Series at the 1998 World Animation Celebration. Mike was also a sequence director on "The Simpsons Movie" (2007), was the supervising director on "The Simpsons Ride" at Universal Studios and is currently the supervising director for "The Simpsons" television series.

The Simpsons episodes directed by Anderson

Season 7
"Lisa the Iconoclast"

Season 8
"Treehouse of Horror 7"
"You Only Move Twice"
"Homer's Phobia"
"The Secret War of Lisa Simpson"

Season 9
"The Last Temptation of Krust"

Season 10
"Homer Simpson in: 'Kidney Trouble'

Season 11
"Hello Gutter, Hello Fadder"

Season 12
"HOMR"
"Trilogy of Error"

Season 13
"Tales from the Public Domain"

Season 14
"How I Spent My Strummer Vacation"
"C.E. D'oh"

Season 15
"The President Wore Pearls"
"Margical History Tour"
"The Way We Weren't"

Season 16
"Fat Man and Little Boy"
"Pranksta Rap"
"Future-Drama"

Season 17
"Marge's Son Poisoning"
"Homer's Paternity Coot"
"The Wettest Stories Ever Told"

Season 18
"Please Homer, Don't Hammer 'Em..."

Season 19
"Mona Leaves-a"

Season 21
"Treehouse of Horror 20"

Season 27
"Halloween of Horror"

References

External links
 

American television directors
Animators from California
American animated film directors
Living people
Emmy Award winners
Annie Award winners
American film directors
Year of birth missing (living people)